This may refer to:

A hereditary title created for James Parke (1782–1868), an English judge, in 1856. Though the title was hereditary, none of his sons survived him, and it thus became extinct upon his death.
A subsidiary title of the Viscount Ridley, created in 1900: the first Viscount Ridley was a grandson of the above.

Extinct baronies in the Peerage of the United Kingdom
Noble titles created in 1856
Baronies in the Peerage of the United Kingdom
Noble titles created in 1900
Noble titles created for UK MPs